Helen Storer is an English bassist, guitarist and singer-songwriter from Cheshire, England.

She began her musical career as a teenager in the high-profile punk rock band Fluffy who were signed to Hut/Virgin Records by Tom Zutaut of Geffen.  Fluffy toured worldwide with acts including the Sex Pistols, Foo Fighters, Marilyn Manson and Neurotic Outsiders. They were also one of the bands on the NME Brat Bus tour.

Storer moved to Los Angeles in the late 1990s and played in the band Fireball Ministry as well as Duff McKagan's band Loaded. She is also a contributing backing vocalist on the Twilight Singers record "She Loves You."

Her solo project band, Thee Heavenly Music Association, with Dave Krusen of Pearl Jam, was praised by the underground indie press.

References

English rock bass guitarists
Women bass guitarists
Living people
Year of birth missing (living people)
Jack Off Jill members